Mehboob Alam (14 March 1948 – 18 March 1994) was a Pakistani actor best known for his role in the PTV drama serial Waris (1979–1982), in which he played the role of Chaudhry Hashmat Khan. He also appeared in the PTV drama Andhera Ujala (1984–1985) and Neelay Hath in 1989.

Mehboob Alam acted in 38 movies (12 Urdu, 15 Punjabi, and 11 Sindhi), including Sooarth (Sindhi, 1973), Rut Ja Ristha, Dharti La Kunwar (1975),<ref>http://www.citwf.com/film86862.htm, Actor Mehboob Alam in film Dharti La Kunwar (1975) on C.I.T.W.F. website, Retrieved 20 Nov 2016</ref> Dharti Dilwaran Jee (Sindhi, 1975), Shehzor (Sindhi, 1976),  Khaak Aur Khoon (Urdu, 1979), Chan Varyam (Punjabi, 1981), Fatafat (Punjabi, 1981), Khan Balouch (Punjabi, 1985), and Darya Khan'' (Sindhi, 1991).

He died on 18 March 1994 in Karachi at age 46.

Awards and recognition
 The 1st Indus Drama Awards in 2005, a 'Special Award' awarded after his death.

References

External links
 http://www.citwf.com/person69216.htm, Filmography of actor Mehboob Alam on Complete Index To World Film (CITWF) website, Retrieved 20 Nov 2016 
 https://www.imdb.com/name/nm1777780/?ref_=fn_nm_nm_1, Filmography of actor Mehboob Alam on IMDb website, Retrieved 20 Nov 2016

1948 births
1994 deaths
Pakistani male television actors
Place of birth missing